Eileen Hope Williams (1884–1958) was a notable New Zealand golfer and community leader. She was born in Rotorua, New Zealand in 1884. She won the Australian Women's Amateur in 1920.

References

1884 births
1958 deaths
New Zealand female golfers
People from Rotorua